Paul Halla (10 April 1931 – 6 December 2005) was an Austrian footballer.

Club career
He played for SK Sturm Graz, Grazer AK and SK Rapid Wien (1953–1965). He skippered Rapid in his final season there.

International career
He earned 34 caps and scored 2 goals for the Austria national football team from 1954 to 1965, and participated in the 1954 FIFA World Cup and the 1958 FIFA World Cup.

Death
He died in a Vienna hospital in December 2005 after stomach surgery.

Honours
Austrian Football Bundesliga (5):
 1954, 1956, 1957, 1960, 1964
Austrian Cup (1):
 1961

References

External links
Rapid Wien players - Rapid Archiv

1931 births
2005 deaths
Austrian footballers
Austria international footballers
1954 FIFA World Cup players
1958 FIFA World Cup players
SK Sturm Graz players
Grazer AK players
SK Rapid Wien players
Austrian Football Bundesliga players
Association football defenders